Kilian, also spelled Cillian or Killian (or alternatively), was an Irish missionary bishop and the Apostle of Franconia (Franconia is nowadays the northern part of Bavaria), where he began his labours in the latter half of the 7th century. His feast day is 8 July.

Background
There are several biographies of him. The oldest texts which refer to him are an 8th-century necrology at Würzburg and the notice by Hrabanus Maurus in his martyrology. The name has several variations in spelling (e.g. Chillian, Killian, Cilian, Kilian). In Ireland, the preferred spelling is Cillian; the name appears thus in the Irish liturgical calendar.

Accounts of his life
According to Irish sources, Kilian was born to noble parents in approximately the year 640 in Cloughballybeg, near Mullagh in the south-east of what is now County Cavan in Ireland. Some records state that Kilian served as a monk in the celebrated monastery at Hy, Hy being an early name for what was later known as Iona. He began his education in Rosscarbery (the School of Ross), County Cork, and completed it in Tuosist in County Kerry.

In the summer of 686 Kilian, with eleven companions, travelled through Gaul to Rome to receive missionary faculties from the Pope, arriving in late autumn and meeting with Pope Conon. From there they traveled to the castle of Würzburg, which was inhabited by the East Frankish ruler, Herzog (Duke) , who was, like his people, still pagan.

The original group separated  – some departing to seek other fields of missionary work, while Kilian with two companions, the priest Colmán (also called Colonan or Kolonat) and the deacon Totnan, remained in Würzburg. Kilian made this town the base of his activity, which extended over an ever-increasing area in East Franconia and Thüringen (Thuringia). He converted Duke Gozbert with a large part of his subjects to Christianity.

Death
Kilian told the Herzog (Duke) that he was in violation of sacred scripture by being married to his brother's widow, Geilana. When Geilana, whom Kilian had failed to convert to Christianity, heard of Kilian's words against her marriage, she was so angry that, in the absence of the Duke, she had her soldiers sent to the main square of Würzburg, where Kilian and his colleagues were preaching, and had him beheaded, along with two of his companions, Colmán and Totnan.

Veneration

Burchard, appointed by Boniface as the first bishop of Würzburg, built a cathedral on the spot where the martyrs were said to have met their deaths and had their relics unearthed and buried within a vault of that cathedral church.

Their skulls, inlaid with precious stones, have been preserved to this day. On St Kilian's Day, a glass case containing the three skulls is removed from a crypt, paraded through the streets before large crowds, and put on display in Würzburg Cathedral (dedicated to Kilian). Statues of these three saints (among others) line the famous Saints' Bridge across the river Main.

Patronage
Kilian is one of the patron saints for sufferers of rheumatism.

Kilian is the patron saint of the parish of Tuosist, near Kenmare in County Kerry, where he is believed to have resided before travelling to Germany. A church and holy well are named after him and his feast day, July 8, is traditionally celebrated with a pattern when crowds visit the well for prayers, followed by evening social events.

He is also the patron saint of Paderborn, Germany.

Iconography
Kilian is usually portrayed wearing a bishop's mitre and holding a sword, which was the instrument of his martyrdom (as in his statue at Würzburg).

Legacy
The Kiliani-Volksfest, which runs for two weeks every July, is the main civil and religious festival in the region around Würzburg, Germany.

St Killian's College, Garron Tower, Northern Ireland is named for him. Also, St. Kilian's Heritage Centre, located in the village of Mullagh in County Cavan. It was opened in 1995 by the then President of Ireland, Mary Robinson. Built by the local community in association with the Diocese of Würzburg in southern Germany, the Heritage Centre features many relics and replicas of the saint. The German School in Dublin, Ireland, is named after St. Kilian as a tribute to the early exchange of education between the two countries of Ireland and Germany.

There are religious buildings which bear his name as well: St. Kilian's Abbey, Würzburg and St. Kilian's Church, Heilbronn are two such places.
Also there is a basic school in Ghana named after him and also a parish church in Mission Viejo, California. Also a parish in Farmingdale, New York

See also
 Kilianstein

References

External links

Medieval German saints
640 births
689 deaths
7th-century Frankish bishops
Irish Christian missionaries
7th-century Christian saints
Colombanian saints
Medieval Irish saints
7th-century Irish bishops
People from County Cavan
Irish expatriates in France
Irish expatriates in Germany
Medieval Irish saints on the Continent